Jukes is a surname. Notable people with the surname include:

Andrew Jukes (theologian) (1815–1901)
Andrew Jukes (missionary) (1847–1931), Anglican missionary
Betty Jukes (1910–2006), British sculptor
Bill Jukes (c.1883–1939), English rugby league footballer who played in the 1900s and 1910s
Francis Jukes (1745–1812), engraver and publisher
David Jukes (born 1956), English cricketer
Hamilton Jukes (1895–1951), British ice hockey player who competed in the 1924 Winter Olympics
John Peter Jukes (1923–2011), English Prelate of the Roman Catholic Church
Joseph Beete Jukes (1811–1869), British geologist
Keith Jukes (1954–2013), Dean of Ripon
Mavis Jukes (born 1947), American author
Norman Jukes (born 1932), English professional footballer
Peter Jukes (born 1960), a British author and screenwriter
Reginald Jukes, rugby league footballer who played in the 1930s and 1940s
Richard Jukes (1804–1867), Primitive Methodist Minister and hymn writer
Thomas H. Jukes (1906–1999), British-American biologist
The Jukes family, a New York hill family that was the subject of Eugenics studies
Alfred John Jukes-Browne (1851–1914), British invertebrate paleontologist
Sylvia Jukes Morris (1935–2020), a British biographer
Gabriella Francesca Jukes Miss World Wales 2019

James Jukes (1990 - present), a British Armed Forces soldier

See also
Mount Jukes (disambiguation)
Juke (disambiguation)
Southside Johnny and the Asbury Jukes